Petersburg High School is a public high school located in Petersburg, Texas (USA), a small farming community in the southern panhandle portion of the state and classified as a 1A school by the UIL. The school is part of the Petersburg Independent School District which encompasses the southeastern corner of Hale County and reaches into portions of Floyd and Crosby counties. In 2015, the school was rated "Improvement Required" by the Texas Education Agency.

Athletics

The school has a rich history of excellence in academics as well as athletics. During the 1960s and 1970s, Petersburg was well known in the area for producing outstanding football teams which competed under the state's University Interscholastic League (UIL) authority.  Due to a decrease in the local population, the school now plays six-man football sanctioned by the UIL.

The Petersburg Buffaloes also compete in the following sports - 

Basketball
Cross Country
Golf
Tennis
Track and Field

State Titles
Football - 
1963(1A)

State Finalist  
Boys Basketball - 
1992(1A)

Band
The school's band was equally notable, annually producing Division I rankings (the UIL's top rank) over a period spanning more than two decades.

References

External links
Petersburg Independent School District
List of Six-man football stadiums in Texas

Schools in Hale County, Texas
Public high schools in Texas
Public middle schools in Texas